Geotrypetes is a genus of caecilians in the family Dermophiidae, although some classifications place it in the family Caeciliidae. They occur in tropical West Africa and are sometimes known as the West African caecilians.

Species 
There are three species:

References

 
Amphibian genera
Amphibians of Sub-Saharan Africa
Taxa named by Wilhelm Peters
Taxonomy articles created by Polbot